Bicellaria is a genus of flies belonging to the family Hybotidae.

The genus was first described by Macquart in 1823.

The species of this genus are found in Europe and Northern America.

Species include:
 Bicellaria spuria (Fallen, 1816)

References

Hybotidae